The black-necked stilt (Himantopus mexicanus) is a locally abundant shorebird of American wetlands and coastlines. It is found from the coastal areas of California through much of the interior western United States and along the Gulf of Mexico as far east as Florida, then south through Central America and the Caribbean to Brazil, Peru and the Galápagos Islands, with an isolated population, the Hawaiian stilt, in Hawaii. The northernmost populations, particularly those from inland, are migratory, wintering from the extreme south of the United States to southern Mexico, rarely as far south as Costa Rica; on the Baja California peninsula it is only found regularly in winter. Some authorities, including the IUCN, treat it as a subspecies of Himantopus himantopus.

Taxonomy

It is often treated as a subspecies of the common or black-winged stilt, using the trinomial name Himantopus himantopus mexicanus. However, the AOS has always considered it a species in its own right, and the scientific name Himantopus mexicanus is often seen. Matters are more complicated though; sometimes all five distinct lineages of the common stilt are treated as different species. The white-backed stilt from much of South America (H. melanurus when the species is recognized) is parapatric and intergrade to some extent with its northern relative where their ranges meet in northern Brazil and central Peru, would warrant inclusion with the black-necked stilt when this is separated specifically, becoming Himantopus mexicanus melanurus. Similarly, the Hawaiian stilt, H. m. knudseni, belongs to the (North) American species when this is considered separate; while it rarely has been treated as another distinct species, the AOS, BirdLife International and the IUCN do not.

Description

Measurements:

 Length: 
 Weight: 
 Wingspan: 

They have long pink legs and a long thin black bill. They are white below and have black wings and backs. The tail is white with some grey banding. A continuous area of black extends from the back along the hind neck to the head. There, it forms a cap covering the entire head from the top to just below eye-level, with the exception of the areas surrounding the bill and a small white spot above the eye. Males have a greenish gloss to the back and wings, particularly in the breeding season. This is less pronounced or absent in females, which have a brown tinge to these areas instead. Otherwise, the sexes look alike.

Downy young are light olive brown with lengthwise rows of black speckles (larger on the back) on the upperparts – essentially where adults are black – and dull white elsewhere, with some dark barring on the flanks.

Where their ranges meet in northern Brazil and central Peru, the black-necked and white-backed stilts intergrade. Such individuals often have some white or grey on top of the head and a white or grey collar separating the black of the hindneck from that of the upper back.

The black-necked stilt is distinguished from non-breeding vagrants of the black-winged stilt by the white spot above the eye. Vagrants of the northern American form in turn are hard to tell apart from the resident Hawaiian stilt, in which only the eye-spot is markedly smaller. But though many stilt populations are long-distance migrants and during their movements can be found hundreds of miles offshore, actual trans-oceanic vagrants are nonetheless a rare occurrence.

Distribution and habitat
The black-necked stilt is found in estuarine, lacustrine, salt pond and emergent wetland habitats; it is generally a lowland bird but in Central America has been found up to  ASL and commonly seen in llanos habitat in northern South America. It is also found in seasonally flooded wetlands. Use of salt evaporation ponds has increased significantly since 1960 in the US, and they may now be the primary wintering habitat; these salt ponds are especially prevalent in southern San Francisco Bay. At the Salton Sea, the black-necked stilt is resident year-round.

This bird is locally abundant in the San Joaquin Valley, where it commonly winters. It is common to locally abundant in appropriate habitat in southern California from April to September.

It also breeds along lake shores in northeastern California and southeastern Oregon as well as along the Colorado River. In North America outside California, the black-necked stilt rarely breeds inland, but it is known as a breeding bird in riparian locales in Arizona and elsewhere in the southern USA. In Arizona, black-necked stilts may be seen along artificially created lakes and drainage basins in the Phoenix metropolitan area, in remnant riparian habitat.

For flocks that summer in the northern Central Valley of California, a migration occurs to the San Joaquin Valley to consolidate with flocks that were already summering there. In coastal areas flocks both summer and winter in these estuarine settings.

Fall migration of the northernly birds takes place from July to September, and they return to the breeding grounds between March and May. Usually, the entire population breeding at any one site arrives, mates, incubates eggs for about a month, and protects and broods the young until they are capable of sustained flight (at 27–31 days old) and leaves again migrating in flocks of about 15 individuals sometimes juveniles congregating in small groups and other times siblings with family groups. There is some seasonal movement of the tropical populations, but this is not long-range and poorly understood.

The parasitic cyclocoeline flatworm Neoallopyge americanensis was described from the air sacs of a black-necked stilt from Texas. Its genus is presently monotypic and seems to be closely related to the similar genus Allopyge, found in Old World cranes.

Food and feeding

The black-necked stilt forages by probing and gleaning primarily in mudflats and lakeshores, but also in very shallow waters near shores; it seeks out a range of aquatic invertebrates – mainly crustaceans (such as shrimp) and other arthropods (such as worms and flies), and mollusks – and small fish, tadpoles and very rarely plant seeds. Its mainstay food varies according to availability; inland birds usually feed mainly on aquatic insects and their larvae, while coastal populations mostly eat other aquatic invertebrates. For feeding areas they prefer coastal estuaries, salt ponds, lakeshores, alkali flats and even flooded fields. For roosting and resting needs, this bird selects alkali flats (even flooded ones), lake shores, and islands surrounded by shallow water.

Breeding

This stilt chooses mudflats, desiccated lacustrine verges, and levees for nest locations, as long as the soil is friable. Reproduction occurs from late April through August in North America, with peak activity in June, while tropical populations usually breed after the rainy season. The nests are typically sited within  of a feeding location, and the pairs defend an extensive perimeter around groups of nests, patrolling in cooperation with their neighbors. The black-necked stilt is actually classified as semicolonial since the nests are rarely found alone and colonies usually number dozens, rarely hundreds of pairs. The nests are frequently established rather close to the water edge, so that their integrity is affected by rising water levels of ponds or tides. This is particularly a hazard in the case of managed salt ponds where water levels may be altered rapidly in the salt pond flooding process.

The clutch size generally is 3–5 eggs with an average of four. For 22–26 days both sexes take turns incubating the eggs. The young are so precocial that they are seen swimming within two hours after hatching and are also capable of rapid land velocity at that early time. In spite of this early development the young normally return to the nest for resting for one or two more days. They fledge after about one month but remain dependent on their parents for some more weeks. Birds begin to breed at 1–2 years of age.

Status
Particularly the North American populations of the black-necked stilt have somewhat declined in the 20th century, mainly due to conversion of habitat for human use and pollution affecting both the birds directly as well as their food stocks. But altogether, the population is healthy and occurs over a large range. This stilt is therefore classified as a Species of Least Concern by the IUCN. The Hawaiian stilt, which on occasionally has been separated as a distinct species, is very rare however and numbers less than 2,000 individuals. Predation by the small Indian mongoose (Urva auropunctata), introduced to hunt rats, is suspected to have contributed to its decline.

Notes

References

 
 
 
 BirdLife International (BLI) [2008]: Black-necked Stilt Species Factsheet. Retrieved 2008-SEP-24.
 
 Corman, T. & Wise-Gervais, C. (2005): Arizona Breeding Bird Atlas. University of New Mexico Press.
 
 Garrett, K. & Dunn, J. (1981): Birds of Southern California. Los Angeles Audubon Society.
 
 Harrison, Colin (1978): A field guide to the nests, eggs and nestlings of North American birds. W. Collins and Company, Cleveland, Ohio.
 
 McCaskie, G.; DeBenedictus, D.; Erickson, R. & Morlan, J. (1979): Birds of Northern California, an annotated field list (2nd ed.). Golden Gate Audubon Society, Berkeley, California.
 Pierce, Ray J. (1996): 1. Black-winged Stilt. In: del Hoyo, Josep; Elliott, Andrew & Sargatal, Jordi (eds.): Handbook of Birds of the World (Volume 3: Hoatzin to Auks): 345, plate 31. Lynx Edicions, Barcelona. 
 Ransom, Kay et al. (1984): Environmental Impact Report for the Corinthian Villas Project on Richardson Bay. Report prepared for the city of Mill Valley by Earth Metrics Inc.
 Rigney, M. & Rigney, T. (1981): A breeding bird survey of the south San Francisco Bay salt pond levee system. U.S. Department of the Interior, Fish and Wildlife Service, San Francisco Bay National Wildlife Refuge special report
 Robinson, Julie A., J. Michael Reed, Joseph P. Skorupa and Lewis W. Oring. (1999). Black-necked Stilt (Himantopus mexicanus), The Birds of North America Online (A. Poole, Ed.). Ithaca: Cornell Lab of Ornithology. Birds of North America.
 Sibley, David Allen (2003): The Sibley Field Guide to Birds of North America. Alfred A. Knopf, New York .
 Sordahl, T. A. 1980. Antipredator behavior and parental care in the American Avocet and Black-necked Stilt (Aves: Recurvirostridae). Phd Thesis. Utah State Univ. Logan.
 Zeiner, David C.; Laudenslayer, William F. & Meyer, Kenneth E. (eds.) (1988): California Wildlife (Vol. 2 Birds). California Department of Fish and Game.

Further reading
 Hayman, Peter; Marchant, John & Prater, Tony (1986): Shorebirds: an identification guide to the waders of the world. Houghton Mifflin, Boston. 
 Stiles, F. Gary & Skutch, Alexander Frank (1989): A guide to the birds of Costa Rica. Comistock, Ithaca.

External links

 Black-necked Stilt Himantopus mexicanus—USGS Patuxent Bird Identification InfoCenter
 Black-necked Stilt Species Account—Cornell Lab of Ornithology
 
 

black-necked stilt
Birds of the Americas
Birds of Hispaniola
Birds of the Dominican Republic
Birds of Haiti
black-necked stilt
black-necked stilt